In mathematics, the eigenvalue problem for the Laplace operator is known as the Helmholtz equation. It corresponds to the linear partial differential equation

When the equation is applied to waves,  is known as the wave number. The Helmholtz equation has a variety of applications in physics, including the wave equation and the diffusion equation, and it has uses in other sciences.

Motivation and uses

The Helmholtz equation often arises in the study of physical problems involving partial differential equations (PDEs) in both space and time.  The Helmholtz equation, which represents a time-independent form of the wave equation, results from applying the technique of separation of variables to reduce the complexity of the analysis.

For example, consider the wave equation

Separation of variables begins by assuming that the wave function  is in fact separable:

Substituting this form into the wave equation and then simplifying, we obtain the following equation:

As a result, this equation is valid in the general case if and only if both sides of the equation are equal to the same constant value. This argument is key in the technique of solving linear partial differential equations by separation of variables.

where we have chosen, without loss of generality, the expression  for the value of the constant. (It is equally valid to use any constant  as the separation constant;  is chosen only for convenience in the resulting solutions.)

Rearranging the first equation, we obtain the Helmholtz equation:

We now have Helmholtz's equation for the spatial variable  and a second-order ordinary differential equation in time. The solution in time will be a linear combination of sine and cosine functions, whose exact form is determined by initial conditions, while the form of the solution in space will depend on the boundary conditions. Alternatively, integral transforms, such as the Laplace or Fourier transform, are often used to transform a hyperbolic PDE into a form of the Helmholtz equation.

Because of its relationship to the wave equation, the Helmholtz equation arises in problems in such areas of physics as the study of electromagnetic radiation, seismology, and acoustics.

Solving the Helmholtz equation using separation of variables

The solution to the spatial Helmholtz equation:

can be obtained for simple geometries using separation of variables.

Vibrating membrane

The two-dimensional analogue of the vibrating string is the vibrating membrane, with the edges clamped to be motionless. The Helmholtz equation was solved for many basic shapes in the 19th century: the rectangular membrane by Siméon Denis Poisson in 1829, the equilateral triangle by Gabriel Lamé in 1852, and the circular membrane by Alfred Clebsch in 1862. The elliptical drumhead was studied by Émile Mathieu, leading to Mathieu's differential equation.

If the edges of a shape are straight line segments, then a solution is integrable or knowable in closed-form only if it is expressible as a finite linear combination of plane waves that satisfy the boundary conditions (zero at the boundary, i.e., membrane clamped).

The Helmholtz equation takes the form

We may impose the boundary condition that  vanishes if ; thus

the method of separation of variables leads to trial solutions of the form

where  must be periodic of period . This leads to

It follows from the periodicity condition that

and that  must be an integer. The radial component  has the form

where the Bessel function  satisfies Bessel's equation

The boundary condition that  vanishes where  will be satisfied if the corresponding wavenumbers are given by

These solutions are the modes of vibration of a circular drumhead.

Three-dimensional solutions

In spherical coordinates, the solution is:

This solution arises from the spatial solution of the wave equation and diffusion equation. Note that these forms are general solutions, and require boundary conditions to be specified to be used in any specific case. For infinite exterior domains, a radiation condition may also be required (Sommerfeld, 1949).

Writing  function  has asymptotics

Paraxial approximation

In the paraxial approximation of the Helmholtz equation, the complex amplitude  is expressed as

where  represents the complex-valued amplitude which modulates the sinusoidal plane wave represented by the exponential factor. Then under a suitable assumption,  approximately solves

where  is the transverse part of the Laplacian.

This equation has important applications in the science of optics, where it provides solutions that describe the propagation of electromagnetic waves (light) in the form of either paraboloidal waves or Gaussian beams.  Most lasers emit beams that take this form.

The assumption under which the paraxial approximation is valid is that the  derivative of the amplitude function  is a slowly varying function of :

This condition is equivalent to saying that the angle  between the wave vector  and the optical axis  is small: .

The paraxial form of the Helmholtz equation is found by substituting the above-stated expression for the complex amplitude into the general form of the Helmholtz equation as follows:

Expansion and cancellation yields the following:

Because of the paraxial inequality stated above, the  term is neglected in comparison with the  term. This yields the paraxial Helmholtz equation. Substituting  then gives the paraxial equation for the original complex amplitude :

The Fresnel diffraction integral is an exact solution to the paraxial Helmholtz equation.

Inhomogeneous Helmholtz equation

The inhomogeneous Helmholtz equation is the equation

where  is a function with compact support, and  This equation is very similar to the screened Poisson equation, and would be identical if the plus sign (in front of the  term) were switched to a minus sign.

In order to solve this equation uniquely, one needs to specify a boundary condition at infinity, which is typically the Sommerfeld radiation condition

in  spatial dimensions, for all angles (i.e. any value of ). Here  where  are the coordinates of the vector .

With this condition, the solution to the inhomogeneous Helmholtz equation is

(notice this integral is actually over a finite region, since  has compact support). Here,  is the Green's function of this equation, that is, the solution to the inhomogeneous Helmholtz equation with  equaling the Dirac delta function, so  satisfies

The expression for the Green's function depends on the dimension  of the space. One has

Finally, for general n,

where  and ,.

See also 
 Laplace's equation (a particular case of the Helmholtz equation)
 Weyl expansion

Notes

References

External links
 Helmholtz Equation at EqWorld: The World of Mathematical Equations.
 
 Vibrating Circular Membrane by Sam Blake, The Wolfram Demonstrations Project.
 Green's functions for the wave, Helmholtz and Poisson equations in a two-dimensional boundless domain

Waves
Elliptic partial differential equations
Hermann von Helmholtz